Sustainable forest management (SFM) is the management of forests according to the principles of sustainable development. Sustainable forest management has to keep the balance between three main pillars: ecological, economic and socio-cultural. Sustainable forestry can seem contradicting to some individuals as the act of logging trees is not sustainable. However, the goal of sustainable forestry is to allow for a balance to be found between ethical forestry and maintaining biodiversity through the means of maintaining natural patterns of disturbance and regeneration. The forestry industry mitigates climate change by boosting carbon storage in growing trees and soils and improving the sustainable supply of renewable raw materials via sustainable forest management. Successfully achieving sustainable forest management will provide integrated benefits to all, ranging from safeguarding local livelihoods to protecting biodiversity and ecosystems provided by forests, reducing rural poverty and mitigating some of the effects of climate change. Forest conservation is essential to stop climate change.

Feeding humanity and conserving and sustainably using ecosystems are complementary and closely interdependent goals. Forests supply water, mitigate climate change and provide habitats for many pollinators, which are essential for sustainable food production. It is estimated that 75 percent of the world's leading food crops, representing 35 percent of global food production, benefit from animal pollination for fruit, vegetable or seed production.

The "Forest Principles" adopted at the Earth Summit (United Nations Conference on Environment and Development) in Rio de Janeiro in 1992 captured the general international understanding of sustainable forest management at that time. A number of sets of criteria and indicators have since been developed to evaluate the achievement of SFM at the global, regional, country and management unit level. These were all attempts to codify and provide for assessment of the degree to which the broader objectives of sustainable forest management are being achieved in practice. In 2007, the United Nations General Assembly adopted the Non-Legally Binding Instrument on All Types of Forests.  The instrument was the first of its kind, and reflected the strong international commitment to promote implementation of sustainable forest management through a new approach that brings all stakeholders together.

The Sustainable Development Goal 15 is also a global initiative aimed at promoting the implementation of sustainable forest management.

Sustainable forest management also helps with climate change adaptation by increasing forest ecosystems' resistance to future climatic hazards and lowering the danger of additional land degradation by repairing and stabilizing soils and boosting their water-retention capacity. It contributes to the provision of a wide range of vital ecosystem services and biodiversity conservation, such as wildlife habitats, recreational amenity values, and a variety of non-timber forest products. 

Conservation of biodiversity is the major management aim in around 13% of the world's forests, while preservation of soil and water resources is the primary management goal in more than 30%.

Definition 
A definition of SFM was developed by the Ministerial Conference on the Protection of Forests in Europe (FOREST EUROPE), and has since been adopted by the Food and Agriculture Organization (FAO). It defines sustainable forest management as:

The stewardship and use of forests and forest lands in a way, and at a rate, that maintains their biodiversity, productivity, regeneration capacity, vitality and their potential to fulfill, now and in the future, relevant ecological, economic and social functions, at local, national, and global levels, and that does not cause damage to other ecosystems.

In simpler terms, the concept can be described as the attainment of balance – balance between society's increasing demands for forest products and benefits, and the preservation of forest health and diversity. This balance is critical to the survival of forests, and to the prosperity of forest-dependent communities.

For forest managers, sustainably managing a particular forest tract means determining, in a tangible way, how to use it today to ensure similar benefits, health and productivity in the future. Forest managers must assess and integrate a wide array of sometimes conflicting factors – commercial and non-commercial values, environmental considerations, community needs, even global impact – to produce sound forest plans. In most cases, forest managers develop their forest plans in consultation with citizens, businesses, organizations and other interested parties in and around the forest tract being managed. The tools and visualization have been recently evolving for better management practices.

The Food and Agriculture Organization of the United Nations, at the request of Member States, developed and launched the Sustainable Forest Management Toolbox in 2014, an online collection of tools, best practices and examples of their application to support countries implementing sustainable forest management.

Because forests and societies are in constant flux, the desired outcome of sustainable forest management is not a fixed one. What constitutes a sustainably managed forest will change over time as values held by the public change.

Ethics behind the forestry industry 
We currently have a lot of threats facing the goal of achieving sustainable forestry including the poor use of resources, lack of understanding of different properties, regions and rights, weak regulations and policies and a lack of forestry law enforcement. A major contributor to all of these threats, is the ethics behind the industry. This is not limited to applying ethics to those who work in the industry but also to the companies and government who regulate it. It is important for those training to be an art of this field, learn the ethics behind the practice, ranging from professional ethics, environmental ethics and philosophical ethics. Having a solid understanding of ethics will allow workers to implement proper practices in their own work and will also provide them with the knowledge to take a stand against employers who do not work ethically and will then be forced to do so. A survey published in 2007 indicated that only 74% of forestry programs include ethics in their curriculum. Of this 74%, 32% is professional ethics, 13% is environmental ethics and 56% is other ethics such as philosophical. A part of ethics involves providing workers with proper training to ensure their own safety and to ensure forestry is conducted in the most environmentally and economically efficient manner. However, many companies disregard proper training resulting employees being in extremely dangerous situations, employees being harmed, fatalities occurring and resources being wasted. Not only is there a lack of training but many forestry workers are not provided with appropriate gear and tools as well as are extremely underpaid especially considering the risks they are being put at. It is crucial for workers to be trained properly, have appropriate resources to do the job and have a pay the reflects their duties and high level of responsibility. This will prevent poor working conditions, loss of resources and will allow workers to be more motivated to do the job properly while applying the ethical practices they were taught. With that being said, in order for this to occur it is important that certain policies and laws are implemented to ensure sustainable forestry. Harvesting plans are an excellent example of what form of policies should be implemented globally as they have proven to allow for sustainable forestry. Harvesting plans require forestry companies to disclose their entire plan in regards to what they intend on logging, where they intend on logging and how. Once they provide a complete harvest plan it is evaluated and if approved these companies are permitted to continue with logging activities. When reviewing these plans, factors such as how forest values are protected, the condition of the forest before harvesting, regeneration strategies and patterns of natural disturbance are all considered before approving or denying the plan. With that being said, the regulations do not stop once the plan is approved. As the harvesting process occurs, regulators monitor the companies' compliance with the plan, the amount of timber harvested, the progress of the regeneration plan as well as surrounding ecological factors and how they are impacted such as soil health, water and habitats.

Criteria and indicators 

Criteria and indicators are tools which can be used to conceptualise, evaluate and implement sustainable forest management. Criteria define and characterize the essential elements, as well as a set of conditions or processes, by which sustainable forest management may be assessed. Periodically measured indicators reveal the direction of change with respect to each criterion.

Criteria and indicators of sustainable forest management are widely used and many countries produce national reports that assess their progress toward sustainable forest management.  There are nine international and regional criteria and indicators initiatives, which collectively involve more than 150 countries. Three of the more advanced initiatives are those of the Working Group on Criteria and Indicators for the Conservation and Sustainable Management of Temperate and Boreal Forests (also called the Montréal Process), Forest Europe, and the International Tropical Timber Organization. Countries who are members of the same initiative usually agree to produce reports at the same time and using the same indicators. Within countries, at the management unit level, efforts have also been directed at developing local level criteria and indicators of sustainable forest management. The Center for International Forestry Research, the International Model Forest Network and researchers at the University of British Columbia have developed a number of tools and techniques to help forest-dependent communities develop their own local level criteria and indicators. Criteria and Indicators also form the basis of third-party forest certification programs such as the Canadian Standards Association's Sustainable Forest Management Standards and the Sustainable Forestry Initiative.

There appears to be growing international consensus on the key elements of sustainable forest management.  Seven common thematic areas of sustainable forest management have emerged based on the criteria of the nine ongoing regional and international criteria and indicators initiatives.  The seven thematic areas are:

 Extent of forest resources
 Biological diversity
 Forest health and vitality
 Productive functions of forest resources
 Protective functions of forest resources
 Socio-economic functions
 Legal, policy and institutional framework.

This consensus on common thematic areas (or criteria) effectively provides a common, implicit definition of sustainable forest management.  The seven thematic areas were acknowledged by the international forest community at the fourth session of the United Nations Forum on Forests and the 16th session of the Committee on Forestry. These thematic areas have since been enshrined in the Non-Legally Binding Instrument on All Types of Forests as a reference framework for sustainable forest management to help achieve the purpose of the instrument.

On 5 January 2012, the Montréal Process, Forest Europe, the International Tropical Timber Organization, and the Food and Agriculture Organization of the United Nations, acknowledging the seven thematic areas, endorsed a joint statement of collaboration to improve global forest-related data collection and reporting and avoiding the proliferation of monitoring requirements and associated reporting burdens.

Ecosystem approach
The ecosystem approach has been prominent on the agenda of the Convention on Biological Diversity (CBD) since 1995. The CBD definition of the Ecosystem Approach and a set of principles for its application were developed at an expert meeting in Malawi in 1995, known as the Malawi Principles. The definition, 12 principles and 5 points of "operational guidance" were adopted by the fifth Conference of Parties (COP5) in 2000. The CBD definition is as follows:

The ecosystem approach is a strategy for the integrated management of land, water and living resources that promotes conservation and sustainable use in an equitable way. Application of the ecosystem approach will help to reach a balance of the three objectives of the Convention. An ecosystem approach is based on the application of appropriate scientific methodologies focused on levels of biological organization, which encompasses the essential structures, processes, functions and interactions among organisms and their environment. It recognizes that humans, with their cultural diversity, are an integral component of many ecosystems.

Sustainable forest management was recognized by parties to the Convention on Biological Diversity in 2004 (Decision VII/11 of COP7) to be a concrete means of applying the Ecosystem Approach to forest ecosystems.  The two concepts, sustainable forest management and the ecosystem approach, aim at promoting conservation and management practices which are environmentally, socially and economically sustainable, and which generate and maintain benefits for both present and future generations. In Europe, the MCPFE and the Council for the Pan-European Biological and Landscape Diversity Strategy (PEBLDS) jointly recognized sustainable forest management to be consistent with the Ecosystem Approach in 2006.

Independent certification

Growing environmental awareness and consumer demand for more socially responsible businesses helped third-party forest certification emerge in the 1990s as a credible tool for communicating the environmental and social performance of forest operations.

There are many potential users of certification, including: forest managers, scientists, policy makers, investors, environmental advocates, business consumers of wood and paper, and individuals.

With third-party forest certification, an independent organization develops standards of good forest management, and independent auditors issue certificates to forest operations that comply with those standards. Forest certification verifies that forests are well-managed – as defined by a particular standard – and chain-of-custody certification tracks wood and paper products from the certified forest through processing to the point of sale.

This rise of certification led to the emergence of several different systems throughout the world. As a result, there is no single accepted forest management standard worldwide, and each system takes a somewhat different approach in defining standards for sustainable forest management.

In its 2009–2010 Forest Products Annual Market Review United Nations Economic Commission for Europe/Food and Agriculture Organization stated: "Over the years, many of the issues that previously divided the (certification) systems have become much less distinct. The largest certification systems now generally have the same structural programmatic requirements."

Third-party forest certification is an important tool for those seeking to ensure that the paper and wood products they purchase and use come from forests that are well-managed and legally harvested. Incorporating third-party certification into forest product procurement practices can be a centerpiece for comprehensive wood and paper policies that include factors such as the protection of sensitive forest values, thoughtful material selection and efficient use of products.

There are more than fifty certification standards worldwide, addressing the diversity of forest types and tenures. Globally, the two largest umbrella certification programs are:
 Programme for the Endorsement of Forest Certification (PEFC)
 Forest Stewardship Council (FSC)
The Forest Stewardship Council's Policy on Conversion states that land areas converted from natural forests to round wood production after November 1994 are ineligible for Forest Stewardship Council certification.

The area of forest certified worldwide is growing slowly.  PEFC is the world's largest forest certification system, with more than two-thirds of the total global certified area certified to its Sustainability Benchmarks.

In North America, there are three certification standards endorsed by PEFC – the Sustainable Forestry Initiative, the Canadian Standards Association's Sustainable Forest Management Standard, and the American Tree Farm System. SFI is the world's largest single forest certification standard by area. FSC has five standards in North America – one in the United States and four in Canada.

While certification is intended as a tool to enhance forest management practices throughout the world, to date most certified forestry operations are located in Europe and North America. A significant barrier for many forest managers in developing countries is that they lack the capacity to undergo a certification audit and maintain operations to a certification standard.

Forest governance 

Although a majority of forests continue to be owned formally by government, the effectiveness of forest governance is increasingly independent of formal ownership. Since neo-liberal ideology in the 1980s and the emanation of the climate change challenges, evidence that the state is failing to effectively manage environmental resources has emerged. Under neo-liberal regimes in the developing countries, the role of the state has diminished and the market forces have increasingly taken over the dominant socio-economic role.
Though the critiques of neo-liberal policies have maintained that market forces are not only inappropriate for sustaining the environment, but are in fact a major cause of environmental destruction. Hardin's tragedy of the commons (1968) has shown that the people cannot be left to do as they wish with land or environmental resources. Thus, decentralization of management offers an alternative solution to forest governance.

The shifting of natural resource management responsibilities from central to state and local governments, where this is occurring, is usually a part of broader decentralization process. According to Rondinelli and Cheema (1983), there are four distinct decentralization options: these are: (i) Privatization – the transfer of authority from the central government to non-governmental sectors otherwise known as market-based service provision, (ii) Delegation – centrally nominated local authority, (iii) Devolution – transfer of power to locally acceptable authority and (iv) Deconcentration – the redistribution of authority from the central government to field delegations of the central government.
The major key to effective decentralization is increased broad-based participation in local-public decision making. In 2000, the World Bank report reveals that local government knows the needs and desires of their constituents better than the national government, while at the same time, it is easier to hold local leaders accountable. From the study of West African tropical forest, it is argued that the downwardly accountable and/or representative authorities with meaningful discretional powers are the basic institutional element of decentralization that should lead to efficiency, development and equity. This collaborates with the World Bank report in 2000 which says that decentralization should improve resource allocation, efficiency, accountability and equity "by linking the cost and benefit of local services more closely".

Many reasons point to the advocacy of decentralization of forest management. (i) Integrated rural development projects often fail because they are top-down projects that did not take local people's needs and desires into account. (ii) National government sometimes have legal authority over vast forest areas that they cannot control, thus, many protected area projects result in increased biodiversity loss and greater social conflict.
Within the sphere of forest management, as state earlier, the most effective option of decentralization is "devolution"-the transfer of power to locally accountable authority. However, apprehension about local governments is not unfounded. They are often short of resources, may be staffed by people with low education and are sometimes captured by local elites who promote clientelist relation rather than democratic participation. Enters and Anderson (1999) point that the result of community-based projects intended to reverse the problems of past central approaches to conservation and development have also been discouraging.

Broadly speaking, the goal of forest conservation has historically not been met when, in contrast with land use changes; driven by demand for food, fuel and profit. It is necessary to recognize and advocate for better forest governance more strongly given the importance of forest in meeting basic human needs in the future and maintaining ecosystem and biodiversity as well as addressing climate change mitigation and adaptation goal. Such advocacy must be coupled with financial incentives for government of developing countries and greater governance role for local government, civil society, private sector and NGOs on behalf of the "communities".

Sustainable forestry operations must also adhere to the International Labour Organization's 18 criteria on human and social rights. Gender equality, health and well-being and community consultation are examples of such rights.

National Forest Funds
The development of National Forest Funds is one way to address the issue of financing sustainable forest management. National forest funds (NFFs) are dedicated financing mechanisms managed by public institutions designed to support the conservation and sustainable use of forest resources. As of 2014, there are 70 NFFs operating globally.

Forest genetic resources
Appropriate use and long-term conservation of forest genetic resources (FGR) is a part of sustainable forest management. In particular when it comes to the adaptation of forests and forest management to climate change. Genetic diversity ensures that forest trees can survive, adapt and evolve under changing environmental conditions. Genetic diversity in forests also contributes to tree vitality and to the resilience towards pests and diseases. Furthermore, FGR has a crucial role in maintaining forest biological diversity at both species and ecosystem levels.

Selecting carefully the forest reproductive material with emphasis on getting a high genetic diversity rather than aiming at producing a uniform stand of trees, is essential for sustainable use of FGR. Considering the provenance is crucial as well. For example, in relation to climate change, local material may not have the genetic diversity or phenotypic plasticity to guarantee good performance under changed conditions. A different population from further away, which may have experienced selection under conditions more like those forecast for the site to be reforested, might represent a more suitable seed source.

By region

Developing world 
In December 2007, at the Climate Change Conference in Bali, the issue of deforestation in the developing world in particular was raised and discussed. The foundations of a new incentive mechanism for encouraging sustainable forest management measures was therefore laid in hopes of reducing world deforestation rates. This mechanism was formalized and adopted as REDD in November 2010 at the Climate Change Conference in Cancun by UNFCCC COP 16.  Developing countries who are signatories of the CBD were encouraged to take measure to implement REDD activities in the hope of becoming more active contributors of global efforts aimed at the mitigation greenhouse gas, as deforestation and forest degradation account for roughly 15% of total global greenhouse gas emissions. The REDD activities are formally tasked with "reducing emissions from deforestation and forest degradation; and the role of conservation, sustainable management of forests and enhancement of forest carbon stocks in developing countries".  REDD+ works in 3 phases. The first phase consists of developing viable strategies, while the second phase begins work on technology development and technology transfer to the developing countries taking part in REDD+ activities. The last phase measures and reports the implementation of the action taken.

In 2021 the LEAF coalition was created, aiming to provide 1 billion dollars to countries that will protect their tropical and subtropical forests.

Great Britain 
The Forestry Commission was founded in 1919 to restore forests to Great Britain after World War 1. The commission regulates both private and public forests, as well as manages private forests. Agricultural land was bought and transformed, totalling 35% of the British woodland area having been possessed at one point in time

Canada 
The province of Ontario has its own sustainable forest management measures in place. A little less than half of all the publicly owned forests of Ontario are managed forests, required by The Crown Forest Sustainability Act to be managed sustainably. Sustainable management is often done by forest companies who are granted Sustainable Forest Licenses which are valid for 20 years. The main goal of Ontario's sustainable forest management measures is to ensure that the forest are kept healthy and productive, conserving biodiversity, all whilst supporting communities and forest industry jobs. All management strategies and plans are highly regulated, arranged to last for a 10-year period, and follow the strict guidelines of the Forest Management Planning Manual. Alongside public sustainable forest management, the government of Ontario encourages sustainable forest management of Ontario's private forests as well through incentives. So far, 44% of Ontario's crown forests are managed.

In order for logging to begin, the forestry companies must present a plan to the government who will then communicate to the public, First Nations and other industries in order to protect forest values. The plan must include strategies on how the forest values will be protected, assessing the state of the forest and whether it is capable of recovering from human activity, and presenting strategies on regeneration.  After the harvest begins, the government monitors if the company is complying within the planned restrictions and also monitors the health of the ecosystem (soil depletion and erosion, water contamination, wildlife...). Failure to comply may result in fines, suspensions, removal of harvesting rights, confiscation of harvested timber and possible imprisonment.

Russia 
In 2019 after severe wildfires and public pressure the Russian government decided to take a number of measures for more effective forest management, what is considered as a big victory for the Environmental movement

Indonesia 
In August 2019, a court in Indonesia stopped the construction of a dam that could heavily hurt forests and villagers in the area

In 2020 the rate of deforestation in Indonesia was the slowest since 1990. It was 75% lower than in 2019. This is because the government stopped issuing new licences to cut forests, including for palm oil plantations. The falling price of palm oil facilitated making it. Very wet weather reduced wildfires what also contributed to the achievement.

United States 
In the beginning of the year 2020 the "Save the Redwoods League" after a successful crowdfunding campaign bought " Alder Creek" a piece of land 583 acres large, with 483 big Sequoia trees including the 5th largest tree in the world. The organizations plan to make there forest thinning that is a controversial operation

Cameroon 
In August 2020, the government of Cameroon suspended the permit for logging in the Ebo forest.

Congo 
In August 2021 UNESCO removed the Salonga National Park from its list of threatened sites. Forbidding oil drilling, reducing poaching played crucial role in the  achievement. The event is considered as a big win to Democratic Republic of the Congo as the Salonga forest is the biggest protected rainforest in Africa.

Kenya

In accordance with Article 10 of the Kenyan Constitution, which mandates the incorporation of sustainable development into all laws and decisions regarding public policy, including forest conservation and management. Kenya responds to continued deforestation, forest degradation, and forest encroachment, which results in conversion of land uses to settlement and agriculture, by taking action.

See also

Biodiversity
Conservation biology
Ecosystem management
Ecosystem-based management
Environmental protection
Forest conservation in the United States
Green furniture
Habitat conservation
Healthy Forests Initiative
Natural environment
Natural landscape
Nature
Overexploitation
Renewable resource
Sustainability
Sustainable development
Sustainable land management
:Category:Forest conservation

Sources

References

External links

 
Habitat management equipment and methods
Forest certification
Forest governance
Forest conservation